Per Henrik Magnus Larsson (born 25 March 1970) is a former professional tennis player from Sweden.

Playing career
Larsson turned professional in 1989 and won his first top-level singles title at Florence in 1990. His first doubles title was also won in Florence, in 1991.

Some of the most significant highlights of Larsson's career came in 1994. He won that year's Grand Slam Cup, defeating World No. 1 Pete Sampras in the final in four sets 7–6, 4–6, 7–6, 6–4. Larsson also reached the semi-finals of the 1994 French Open, and was part of the Swedish team which won the 1994 Davis Cup. He won singles rubbers in the Davis Cup final in Moscow in December against both Yevgeny Kafelnikov and Alexander Volkov, as Sweden defeated Russia, 4–1.

In 1995, Larsson reached his career-high singles ranking of World No. 10 and his career-high doubles ranking of World No. 26. He was runner-up in the men's doubles at the French Open that year (partnering Nicklas Kulti). He was also part of the Swedish team which won the World Team Cup.

Larsson played in the final of the Davis Cup again in 1997. And again he won both his singles rubbers – against Pete Sampras and Michael Chang – and was on the winning team as Sweden thrashed the United States 5–0.

Larsson won a total of seven singles and six doubles titles during his career. His last doubles title was won in 1998 in Båstad. His final singles title came in 2000 at the Regions Morgan Keegan Championships in Memphis. He retired from the professional tour in 2003. He has since played in the senior Outback Champions Series, winning the Stanford Championships in 2006.

Junior Grand Slam finals

Singles: 1 (1 runner-up)

ATP career finals

Singles: 15 (7 titles, 8 runner-ups)

Doubles: 8 (6 titles, 2 runner-ups)

ATP Challenger and ITF Futures finals

Singles: 7 (4–3)

Doubles: 8 (5–3)

Performance timelines

Singles

Doubles

External links
 
 
 
 

People from Olofström Municipality
Swedish male tennis players
Olympic tennis players of Sweden
Tennis players at the 1992 Summer Olympics
1970 births
Living people
Sportspeople from Blekinge County
20th-century Swedish people